Catherine Michelle "Katie" Meili (born April 16, 1991) is a former American competitive swimmer, who won a bronze medal at the 2016 Summer Olympics in the 100 meter breaststroke and a gold medal for swimming the preliminary heats of the 4 × 100-meter medley relay. In 2020, Meili joined USA Swimming Board of Directors for a four-year term as their Athlete Representative.

Personal life
Meili was born in Carrollton, Texas, and her hometown is Colleyville, Texas. She graduated from Nolan Catholic High School in 2009 and Columbia University in 2013. As of 2019 she attends Georgetown Law School and is an assistant coach for their swim team. On July 8, 2019 she officially announced her retirement from competitive swimming.

Career

2014-2015
In 2014, Meili won the 100-yard freestyle and 200-yard individual medley events at the short-course winter national championships in Greensboro, North Carolina. At the 2015 US Nationals in San Antonio, Texas, she won her first long-course national title, in the 100-meter breaststroke. At the 2015 Pan American Games in Toronto, Canada, she won the gold medal in the 100-meter breaststroke. In the heats she broke the Pan Am Games record with a time of 1:05.64. At the Duel in the Pool meet in December 2015, she broke the world record in the 4×100-meter medley relay (short course) together with her teammates Courtney Bartholomew, Kelsi Worrell, and Simone Manuel.

2016 Summer Olympics

In 2016, Meili placed second in the 100-meter breaststroke at the US Olympic Trials and qualified for the US Olympic team for the 2016 Summer Olympics in Rio de Janeiro, Brazil. At the Olympics, she touched third in the 100-meter breaststroke behind Lilly King and Yuliya Yefimova, earning her the bronze medal. She also swam the breaststroke leg of the 4 × 100-meter medley relay in the preliminary heats, splitting a quick 1:04.93, to help the US qualify for the final. She earned a gold medal when the US team won in the finals.

2017 World Championships 
At the 2017 World Aquatics Championships, Meili won silver in the 100-meter breaststroke with a personal best time of 1:05.03, two-hundredths of a second ahead of third-place finisher Yefimova.

Personal best times

USA swimming
In 2020, Meili joined USA Swimming Board of Directors for a four-year term as their Athlete Representative.

References

External links

 
 
 
 
 
 

1991 births
Living people
American female breaststroke swimmers
American female freestyle swimmers
American female medley swimmers
Olympic bronze medalists for the United States in swimming
Medalists at the 2016 Summer Olympics
Swimmers at the 2016 Summer Olympics
World record holders in swimming
Pan American Games gold medalists for the United States
Sportspeople from the Dallas–Fort Worth metroplex
People from Carrollton, Texas
People from Colleyville, Texas
Olympic gold medalists for the United States in swimming
Pan American Games medalists in swimming
World Aquatics Championships medalists in swimming
Swimmers at the 2015 Pan American Games
Columbia Lions women's swimmers
Georgetown University Law Center alumni
Medalists at the 2015 Pan American Games
21st-century American women